Burning Heart may refer to:

Burning Heart (novel), a 1997 novel by David Stone
The Burning Heart (film), a 1929 German silent film
The Burning Heart (album), a 2011 album by Takida
"Burning Heart" (song), a 1985 song by Survivor
Burning Heart Records, a Swedish record label

See also
An Ardent Heart, an 1869 novel by Alexander Ostrovsky
An Ardent Heart (film), a 1953 Soviet adaptation of the novel